Maryland House of Delegates District 41 is one of 47 legislative districts in the state of Maryland and one of the 5 located entirely within Baltimore City.

Voters in this district select three Delegates every four years to represent them in the Maryland House of Delegates.

Demographic characteristics
As of the 2020 United States census, the district had a population of 108,555, of whom 86,477 (79.7%) were of voting age. The racial makeup of the district was 28,897 (26.6%) White, 68,444 (63.1%) African American, 300 (0.3%) Native American, 3,134 (2.9%) Asian, 11 (0.0%) Pacific Islander, 3,156 (2.9%) from some other race, and 4,599 (4.2%) from two or more races. Hispanic or Latino of any race were 4,832 (4.5%) of the population.

The district had 77,305 registered voters as of October 17, 2020, of whom 8,531 (11.0%) were registered as unaffiliated, 5,155 (6.7%) were registered as Republicans, 62,768 (81.2%) were registered as Democrats, and 574 (0.7%) were registered to other parties.

Educational institutions

High schools
The 41st district is home to Baltimore Polytechnic Institute, Western High School, Forest Park High School (Maryland), Bryn Mawr School, Gilman School, Roland Park Country School, Edmondson-Westside High School and Northwestern High School (Baltimore, Maryland)

Political representation
The district is represented for the 2023–2027 legislative term in the State Senate by Jill P. Carter (D) and in the House of Delegates by Dalya Attar (D), Tony Bridges (D) and Samuel I. Rosenberg (D).

Election results

References

Baltimore
41
41